Dirk van Foreest (3 May 1862 – 24 February 1956) was a Dutch chess master. The elder brother of Arnold van Foreest, he thrice won Dutch Championship (in 1885, 1886, and 1887). He also took fifth place in 1884 and took second place, behind Rudolf Loman, in 1888. He is the great-great granduncle of Jorden van Foreest, who won the Dutch Championship in 2016.

By profession, van Foreest was a medical doctor, and Max Euwe once said he could have been World Champion if he had dedicated himself fully to chess.

References

1862 births
1956 deaths
Dutch chess players
Jonkheers of the Netherlands
People from Haarlemmermeer
Van Foreest family
Sportspeople from North Holland